Pellaea viridis, the green cliff brake, is a fern indigenous to Africa, Yemen, some Pacific Ocean islands and India. It is an invasive species in Australia.

References

viridis
Ferns of Africa
Ferns of Asia
Ferns of Oceania
Flora of India (region)
Flora of Yemen